Tubiclavoididae is a family of cnidarians belonging to the order Anthoathecata.

Genera:
 Tubiclavoides Moura, Cunha & Schuchert, 2007

References

Filifera
Cnidarian families